The 2014 Tour de Wallonie was the 41st edition of the Tour de Wallonie cycle race and was held on 26–30 July 2014. The race started in Frasnes-lez-Anvaing and finished in Ans. The race was won by Gianni Meersman.

Teams
Seventeen teams competed in the 2014 Tour de Wallonie. These included eleven UCI ProTeams, four UCI Professional Continental and two UCI Continental teams.

The teams that participated in the race were:

Route

Stages

Stage 1
26 July 2014 — Frasnes-lez-Anvaing to Tournai,

Stage 2
27 July 2014 —  to Perwez,

Stage 3
28 July 2014 — Somme-Leuze to Neufchâteau,

Stage 4
29 July 2014 — Herve to Waremme,

Stage 5
30 July 2014 — Malmedy to Ans,

Classification leadership table

References

External links

Tour de Wallonie
Tour de Wallonie
2014 UCI Europe Tour